Deudorix mpanda is a butterfly in the family Lycaenidae. It is found in Tanzania (from the western part of the country to Mpanda District). The habitat consists of montane areas at altitudes between 1,400 and 1,700 m, with scattered stunted woodland and forest margins.

References

Endemic fauna of Tanzania
Butterflies described in 1990
Deudorigini
Deudorix